Naresh Sawal is an Indian Politician from the state of Goa. He is a first term member of the Goa Legislative Assembly representing the Bicholim constituency.

Political Career
He was one of the few Independent Members of the Goa Legislative Assembly until 4 January 2016, when he joined the Maharashtrawadi Gomantak Party.

Constituency
He represented the Bicholim constituency.

External links 
  Members of the Goa Legislative Assembly

References 

Members of the Goa Legislative Assembly
Living people
People from North Goa district
Bharatiya Janata Party politicians from Goa
Maharashtrawadi Gomantak Party politicians
Independent politicians in India
Year of birth missing (living people)